Islam in Switzerland has mostly arrived via immigration since the late 20th century. Numbering below 1% of total population in 1980, the fraction of Muslims in the population of permanent residents in Switzerland has quintupled in thirty years, estimated at just above 5% as of 2013.
A majority is from Former Yugoslavia (estimated at 56% as of 2010, most of them from Kosovo); an additional 20% (2010 estimate) is from Turkey. This is due to the fact that in the 1960s and 1970s Switzerland encouraged young men from Yugoslavia and Turkey to come as guest workers. Initially these young men were only planning on staying in Switzerland temporarily, however, revised Swiss immigration laws in the 1970s permitted family regrouping. Consequently, these men ended up staying in Switzerland as these new laws allowed the wives and children of these young men into the country. Since this time period, most of the Muslim immigration to Switzerland stems from asylum seekers arriving primarily from Eastern Europe.

The vast majority of Muslims in Switzerland adhere to the Sunni branch. Notable Swiss Muslims include Tariq Ramadan, Frithjof Schuon, Titus Burckhardt, Granit Xhaka, Xherdan Shaqiri and Isabelle Eberhardt.

Demographics
The largest concentration of Muslim population is in the German-speaking Swiss plateau. The cantons with more than 5% Muslim population are:

8.17%   Basel-Stadt
7.72%   Glarus
7.63%   Solothurn
7.54%   St. Gallen
7.14%   Aargau
7.02%   Schaffhausen
6.51%   Thurgau
6.49%   Zürich
6.24%   Geneva
5.61%   Basel-Landschaft
5.22%   Vaud

Geneva is the only non-German-speaking canton where the Muslim population (6.24%) is slightly above the average (5.40%). Another remarkable demographic feature in comparison to other European countries is the relatively equal distribution throughout the country (compare Islam in the United Kingdom). No administrative unit has more than 8.55% of Muslim population, and no town or village more than 16.8%. The lowest percentage of Muslims in a canton is 1.82% (the Italian-speaking Ticino).

88.3% of Muslims in Switzerland are of foreign background (56.4% from former Yugoslavia, mostly Bosniaks, and Albanians from Kosovo), 20.2% from Turkey and 6% from Africa (3.4% from North Africa). 10,000 of the 400,000 Muslims are believed be converts.

History
In the 10th century, Arabs from their Mediterranean Fraxinet base settled in the Valais for a few decades. They occupied the Great St. Bernard Pass and even managed to reach as far as St. Gallen to the north and Raetia in the east.

Islam was virtually absent from Switzerland until the 20th century.
It appeared with the beginning of significant immigration to Europe, after World War II.
A first mosque was built in Zürich in 1963 by the Ahmadiyya Muslim community. Muslim presence during the 1950s and 1960s was mostly due to the presence of international diplomats and rich Saudi tourists in Geneva.

Substantial Muslim immigration began in the 1970s, and accelerated dramatically over the 1980s to 1990s. In 1980, there were 56,600 Muslims in Switzerland (0.9% of total population). This ratio quintupled over the following thirty years, notably due to the immigration from Former Yugoslavia during the 1990s Yugoslav War. While the Muslim population continues to grow rapidly, the rate of growth has decreased after the early 1990s. The growth rate corresponded to a factor of 2.7 over the 1980s (10% per annum), a factor of 2.0 over the 1990s (7% p.a.), and a factor of about 1.6 over the 2000s (5% p.a.).

The burka was outlawed in the canton of Ticino after a citizen initiative to hold a referendum. With 65% in favour of a ban and it was ruled that the ban was constitutional, the ban took effect in July 2016. Those who violate the law face a fine of up to CHF 10,000. One of the primary figures behind this burka ban is now attempting to ban Muslims from praying in public.

In 2017, an imam was charged for inciting violence by calling a sermon for Muslims who refused to pray to be burned alive.

In 2018, a Muslim couple was denied citizenship when they refused to answer questions from members of the Lausanne naturalisation board if they were asked by people of the opposite sex. Their behaviour was found to disrespect a fundamental principle of the Swiss constitution, equality between men and women.

In September 2018, a ban on face-covering veils was approved with a 67% vote in favour in the canton of St Gallen. The Islamic Central Council, which falsely claims to be the largest Islamic community organisation in Switzerland (whose members make up less than 1% of the estimated 400,000 Muslims in Switzerland) recommended that Muslim women continue to cover their faces.

Organizations
Swiss Muslim organizations begin to form in the 1980s. 
An umbrella organization (GIOS, Gemeinschaft islamischer Organisationen der Schweiz) was formed in Zürich in 1989.
Numerous organizations were formed during the 1990s to 2000s, including
 1994 Organisation Muslime und Musliminnen der Schweiz
 1995 Vereinigung Islamischer Organisationen Zürich (VIOZ), Zurich
 1997 Basler Muslim Kommission, Basle
 2000 Koordination Islamischer Organisationen Schweiz (KIOS), Berne
 2002 Vereinigung islamischer Organisationen des Kantons Luzern (VIOKL), Lucerne
 2003 Dachverband islamischer Gemeinden der Ostschweiz und des Fürstentums Liechtenstein
 2006 Föderation Islamischer Dachorganisationen in der Schweiz (FIDS)
 2009 Islamic Central Council of Switzerland (ICCS; German Islamischer Zentralrat Schweiz IZRS), Berne. IZRS is a comparatively minor organisation (with an estimated 960 members in 2010) but has a disproportionate media presence because of its radical Salafist orientation and because a disproportionate number of its members (an estimated 10%) are native Swiss converts.

Mosques

It is estimated that there are 260 mosques and prayer rooms with connected services in Switzerland. In comparison to the European average, Switzerland has the second lowest number of mosques per Muslim inhabitant, with about one mosque to every 4000 Muslims in Switzerland.

There are two Swiss mosques which predate 1980 and the rapid increase of immigration of Muslims from the Balkans and Turkey over the following decades. 
Today, there are numerous mosques and prayer rooms across the country,  predominantly in the urban parts of the Swiss plateau.

In 2007 the Bern city council rejected plans to build one of the largest Islamic cultural centers in Europe.

Four Swiss mosques have minarets, there is a mosque in Zurich, a mosque in Geneva, a mosque in Winterthur, a mosque in Wangen bei Olten. The latter was erected in 2009 following several years of political and legal disputes. In the wake of the Wangen minaret controversy,  a popular initiative was passed with 57.5% of the popular vote in November 2009, introducing a ban on the construction of new minarets. The four existing minarets are not affected by the ban.
Although the Swiss People's Party won the poll, the campaign was rocked by the conversion to Islam of Daniel Streich, a council member from the party. Streich left the SPP in opposition to  their campaign against new minarets. The referendum also prompted concerns from other countries, with the perception that the Swiss electorate was increasingly shifting towards the right.

Attitudes 
In a 2018 survey conducted by Switzerland's Federal Statistics Office, 29% of Swiss respondents said they mistrusted Islam and 11% said they mistrusted Islamic followers. Comparatively, in 2016, 14% of Swiss respondents said that they mistrusted Islamic followers.

See also
Religion in Switzerland
Turks in Switzerland
Arabs in Switzerland

References

Further reading

Marcel Stüssi MODELS OF RELIGIOUS FREEDOM: Switzerland, the United States, and Syria by Analytical, Methodological, and Eclectic Representation,  375 ff. (Lit 2012)., by Marcel Stüssi, research fellow at the University of Lucerne.

External links
Swiss Exile: European Muslim Congress, 1935 by Martin Kramer.
Islam in Switzerland
Centre Al Hikma de Lausanne - Réseau social